Dennis Tørset Johnsen (born 17 February 1998) is a Norwegian professional footballer who plays as a winger for  club Venezia.

Club career
Johnsen started his career at local club Tiller IL and moved to the youth academy of Rosenborg BK in 2013. In 2015 he joined SC Heerenveen. He signed for Ajax in August 2017. In January 2019 he returned to SC Heerenveen on loan for the rest of the season.

On 25 August 2020 he signed a 4-year contract with Italian Serie B club Venezia.

International career
He made his debut for the Norway national football team on 11 October 2021 in a World Cup qualifier against Montenegro.

Career statistics

Club

Personal life

He is the son of retired footballer Tor Gunnar Johnsen and the brother of Mikael Tørset Johnsen.

References

External links
 

1998 births
Living people
Norwegian footballers
Norwegian expatriate footballers
Association football wingers
Eredivisie players
Eerste Divisie players
Serie A players
Serie B players
AFC Ajax players
Jong Ajax players
SC Heerenveen players
PEC Zwolle players
Venezia F.C. players
Norway under-21 international footballers
Norway youth international footballers
Norway international footballers
Expatriate footballers in the Netherlands
Expatriate footballers in Italy
Sportspeople from Skien